In Spanish football, the Trofeo Pichichi is awarded by the sports newspaper Marca to the top goalscorer of each La Liga season. Named after the Athletic Bilbao striker Rafael "Pichichi" Moreno, the trophy has been awarded annually since the 1952–53 season. All top scorers who preceded the award's creation were retroactively named Pichichi winners by Marca. Since the 2014–15 season, the top scorer of the Liga Iberdrola is also awarded the Pichichi Trophy.

The Pichichi is not officially recognised by the league's governing body, the Liga Nacional de Fútbol Profesional. As the award is based on Marcas subjective criteria, its data may differ from the official match delegate reports. For the top scorers in the Spanish football league according to LaLiga data, see List of La Liga top scorers. The player with the record number of wins is Lionel Messi with eight, all with Barcelona.

Winners

Key

Statistics

Wins by player (multiple)

Consecutive wins

Wins by club

Wins by country

See also
 Spanish football top scorers, based on official La Liga match delegate reports
 Zarra Trophy, awarded by Marca to the Spanish top goalscorer in La Liga
 Ricardo Zamora Trophy, awarded by Marca to the top goalkeeper in La Liga
 Premier League Golden Boot
 Capocannoniere
 List of Bundesliga top scorers
 List of Ligue 1 top scorers
 List of Süper Lig top scorers
 List of Eredivisie top scorers
 List of Ukrainian Premier League top scorers
 List of Portugal Premier League top scorers
 List of Russian Premier League top scorers
 List of top international association football goal scorers by country

Notes

References

Other sources
 
 Liga Nacional de Fútbol Profesional historical archive

External links
Pichichi, a history of the award and up to date Pichichi standings

La Liga trophies and awards
Spanish football trophies and awards
Spain
Association football player non-biographical articles